Dongxinfang Subdistrict is a subdistrict located within within  Mentougou District, Beijing, China. It borders Longquan Town and Chengzi Subdistrict in the north, Dayu Subdistrict in the east, Longquan and Tanzhesi Towns in the south, and Longquan Town in the west. Its population was 36,076. 

The subdistrict took its name from Dongxinfang Village that used to exist within the region.

History

Administrative Divisions 
Dongxinfang Subdistrict oversaw 9 communities as of 2021:

See also 

 List of township-level divisions of Beijing

References 

Mentougou District
Subdistricts of Beijing